Myth Makers Super Kart GP is a racing game from English developer/publisher Data Design Interactive. It was released in January 2006 for Windows. In February 2007, Data Design announced it would release the game on the Wii.

Gameplay
The game is set in 5 levels which were designed to appeal to children. Players can play as one of 8 drivers (referred to as "Myth Makers"). The game features pick-ups like weapons and shields that affect gameplay. Players can also choose from 8 different vehicles (referred to as "karts"). Each kart has different handling, speed and acceleration. The drivers also have special powers.

Courses also feature 20 variations, 5 each for daytime, nighttime, forward and reverse tracks. There is a single player mode, time trial, and tournament mode. Players can earn rewards to unlock vehicles, levels and special powers.

Each character has his or her own course. Some of the characters are Trixie (a girl in a bunny costume), Jack (a boy in a snowman costume), and Zeek (a boy in a pumpkin costume).

Reception
The game received a 3.5/10 from IGN, which was their highest score  for a Data Design-made Wii game.

References

2006 video games
Data Design Interactive games
PlayStation 2 games
Kart racing video games
Racing video games
Fantasy video games
Video games developed in the United Kingdom
Wii games
Windows games
Multiplayer and single-player video games
Conspiracy Entertainment games